Vanity Fair is a 1987 BBC Pebble Mill Production consisting of sixteen 35 minute episodes. It is an adaptation of the 1848 novel Vanity Fair by William Makepeace Thackeray. The serial was shot on location and in studio. Locations included Winchester and Thetford. Virtually all the interiors were shot in Studio A at Pebble Mill.

The series stars Eve Matheson as Becky Sharp, Rebecca Saire as Amelia Sedley, Simon Dormandy as William Dobbin, Jack Klaff as Rawdon Crawley, David Swift as Mr. Sedley, James Saxon as Joseph 'Jos' Sedley, Gillian Raine as Mrs. Sedley, Benedict Taylor as George Osborne, Shaughan Seymour as Pitt Crawley, Philippa Urquhart as Miss Briggs and Freddie Jones as Sir Pitt Crawley. Amanda Murray appeared as Ann Dobbin in three episodes.

The story is set in the time of the Napoleonic Wars. Becky Sharp, a poor orphan girl, schemes for money and position. Her most-used stepladder is her old school friend, Amelia Sedley. Both women marry soldiers, and both of them are affected by the Battle of Waterloo.

Episodes

References

External links
 
 

1980s British drama television series
1987 British television series debuts
1987 British television series endings
BBC television dramas
Films based on Vanity Fair (novel)
Cultural depictions of George IV